Verhaegen is a Dutch-language toponymic surname common in the Belgian provinces of Antwerp and Flemish Brabant. Though, like Verhagen, meaning "from the bushland or hedged lot", at least the name of the noble family of Pierre-Théodore Verhaegen finds its origin in the town of Haacht (originally meaning "hedge" as well).  Some other variant spellings of the name are Verhaagen, Verhaeghe, Verhaeghen, Verhage, and Verhaghen. People with the name include:

Arthur Verhaegen (1847–1917), Belgian architect and a Catholic Party politician, grandson of Pierre-Théodore
 (1886–1965), Belgian composer and Benedictine monk
Benoît Verhaegen (1929–2009), Belgian historian on Congo
Fernand Verhaegen (1883–1975), Belgian painter and etcher
Frans Verhaegen (born 1948), Belgian racing cyclist
 (born 1957), Belgian comics artist
Marie-Pierre Verhaegen (born 1966), Belgian historian and countess
Pé Verhaegen (1902–1958), Belgian racing cyclist
Peter Verhaegen (1800-1868), Belgian Catholic priest, missionary to the United States, first president of Saint Louis University and St. Joseph's College in Bardstown, Kentucky
Pierre-Théodore Verhaegen (1796–1862), Flemish lawyer and liberal politician, founder of the Free University of Brussels
Theodoor Verhaegen (1701–1759), Flemish sculptor

See also
Paul Verhaeghen (born 1965), Belgian novelist
Mount Verhaegen, an Antarctic mountain named for Baron Pierre Verhaegen, collaborator of the expedition
Saint-Verhaegen, a holiday celebrating the founding of the Free University of Brussels

References

Dutch-language surnames
Surnames of Belgian origin
Toponymic surnames
Belgian noble families